The slender chained gecko (Lepidodactylus pumilus) is a species of gecko. It is found in Queensland and Cape York Peninsula in Australia, the Torres Strait Islands, and Papua New Guinea.

References

Lepidodactylus
Geckos of Australia
Reptiles of Papua New Guinea
Reptiles described in 1885
Taxa named by George Albert Boulenger
Geckos of New Guinea